Victory Monument may refer to the following structures:
Bolzano Victory Monument in Italy
Bukgwan Victory Monument in North Korea
Victory Monument (Bangkok) in Thailand
Victory Monument (Chicago) in the United States of America
Victory Monument (Tolyatti) in Russia
Victory Monument (Riga) in Latvia
Victory Monument (Ankara) in Turkey

See also
Triumphal arch
Victory column
:Category:Victory monuments